Agapanthia gemella is a species of beetle in the subfamily Lamiinae, that is endemic to Cyprus. They feed on Fabaceae species, particularly Erophaca baetica orientalis. They fly from March to April.

References

gemella
Beetles described in 1989
Endemic arthropods of Cyprus